Marianne Vitale (born 1973) is an American artist living and working in New York City.

Career

Vitale graduated from The School of Visual Arts in 1996 with a BFA in Film.

Exhibitions

For the 2010 Whitney Biennial, Vitale exhibited the video Patron. Peter Schjeldahl of The New Yorker wrote: "The most prepossessing is an energetic performance by...Vitale, who...harangues 'patrons' with colorfully worded...insults and commands. The provoked notion of contemporary art as an arena of sadomasochism is just cogent enough to chill, a trifle."

Vitale's ongoing sculptural series of Burned Bridges has been part of several solo gallery and museum exhibitions including What I Need to Do Is Lighten The Fuck Up About A Lot of Shit at Zach Feuer; Bright Dark Future at Le Confort Moderne; If You Expect To Rate as a Gentleman, Do Not Expectorate On the Floor at Unge Kunstneres Samfund; Lost Marbles at Le Marbrerie, Montreuil; and Huey, Dewey & Louie at Kunstraum Innsbruck.

Her solo show, Diamond Crossing at Zach Feuer (2013), was applauded by the New York Times' Ken Johnson as “approaching a near-perfect 10…occupy[ing] the space with awesome  implacability…[and] art-historical sophistication.”

For the Performa '13 Biennial, Vitale was commissioned to produce The Missing Book of Spurs, a performance set in a "saloon/[brothel]/weather station."

Other venues that have exhibited Vitale's work include Venus Over Los Angeles, The Contemporary Austin, The Journal Gallery, Karma, Various Small Fires, the Elaine de Kooning House, the Rubell Family Collection, Kling & Bang, White Columns, Brooklyn Museum, Contemporary Fine Arts Berlin, Mosquito Coast Factory and Contemporary Art Centre Vilnius.

From April 2014 through March 2015, Vitale's outdoor sculptural exhibition Common Crossings was presented on the High Line in New York City, curated by Cecilia Alemani.

In 2019 the city of Savenay, France commissioned Vitale to create Worthies, a public, permanent installation. On this occasion, a book entitled The World, the Flesh and the Devil was published by American Art Catalogues. Also in 2019 Vitale was working with Agathe Snow  on projects including "Double Vision" including paintings and drawings, some made with food items like mustard and coffee grounds.

References

External links 
 Marianne Vitale
 Ken Johnson, "Marianne Vitale: ‘Diamond Crossing’" New York Times, June 6, 2013
 Holland Cotter, "At a Biennial on a Budget, Tweaking and Provoking" New York Times, February 10, 2010

Living people
1973 births
American contemporary artists
Contemporary sculptors
Sculptors from New York (state)
People from East Rockaway, New York
20th-century American women artists
21st-century American women